The Edict of Boulogne, also called the Edict of Pacification of Boulogne and the Peace of La Rochelle, was signed in June 1573  by Charles IX of France in the Château de Madrid in the Bois de Boulogne.  It was officially registered by the Parlement of Paris on 11 August 1573.  The treaty officially ended the fourth phase of the French Wars of Religion (set off by the St. Bartholomew's Day massacre in August 1572; this phase of the wars included the siege of La Rochelle (1572-1573) and the Siege of Sancerre).

Content
The treaty severely curtailed many of the rights granted to the French Protestants in the previous Peace of Saint-Germain-en-Laye. Based on the terms of the treaty, all Huguenots were granted amnesty for their past actions and the freedom of belief. However, they were permitted the freedom to worship only within the three towns of La Rochelle, Montauban, and Nîmes, and there only privately within their own residences; Protestant nobles with the right of high-justice were permitted to celebrate marriages and baptisms, but only before an assembly limited to ten persons outside of their family. Outside of the three mentioned cities, Protestant worship was forbidden completely.

Due to pressure from the Catholic League, Henry III of France had to cancel the Peace of La Rochelle, re-criminalizing Protestantism and beginning a new chapter in the French Wars of Religion, which did not conclude until Henry IV issued the Edict of Nantes in 1598.

See also
List of treaties

References
Books
 Arlette Jouanna and Jacqueline Boucher, Dominique Biloghi, Guy Thiec.  Histoire et dictionnaire des Guerres de religion.  Collection: Bouquins.  Paris: Laffont, 1998. 
R. J. Knecht, The French Wars of Religion 1559–1598 (Seminar Studies in History)

Notes

External links
Catholic Encyclopedia: Huguenots

French Wars of Religion
1573 in France
Boulogne
Boulogne
Charles IX of France
1573 in Christianity
1573 treaties
16th-century military history of France